The 2020–21 BBL Championship of the 2020–21 BBL season, the 34th season of the British Basketball League started on 3 December 2020 to 30 April 2021.

Ladder 
The BBL Championship will return to the three game series format used prior to the 2019–20 season, for a 30-game regular season. There will be 21 Rounds between 3 December 2020 and 30 April 2021.

Standings

Ladder progression
 Numbers highlighted in green indicate that the team finished the round inside the top eight.
 Numbers highlighted in blue indicates the team finished first on the ladder in that round.
 Numbers highlighted in red indicates the team finished last place on the ladder in that round.

Games

Round 1

Round 2

Round 3

Round 4

 Surrey Scorchers’ BBL Championship fixtures against Worcester Wolves (28 December), London Lions (1 January) and Leicester Riders (3 January) have been postponed due to self-isolation requirements following a player testing positive for COVID-19. Under the Covid-19 rule amendments, these fixtures will be rescheduled as soon as possible.
 With an abundance of caution, the game between Leicester Riders and Bristol Flyers scheduled for 23 December has also been postponed and will be rescheduled as soon as possible.

Round 5

Round 6

 Surrey Scorchers’ BBL Championship fixture against Plymouth Raiders (10 January) has been postponed on advice of Surrey’s club doctor, in line with the BBL’s return to play guidelines, following the return to play of multiple players and coaches after testing positive for Covid-19. Under the Covis-19 rule amendments, this fixture will be rescheduled as soon as possible.
 With an abundance of caution, the game between Cheshire Phoenix and B Braun Sheffield Sharks scheduled for Sunday 10 January has been postponed and will be rescheduled as soon as possible.

Round 7

Round 8

Round 9

Round 10

Round 11

Round 12

Round 13

Round 14

Round 15

Round 16

Round 17

Round 18

Round 19

Round 20

Round 21

Round 22

Notes

References

External links

British Basketball League seasons
2020–21 in British basketball
Britain